Hoàng Thị Thân (born in 1944 at Phú Cường (Thủ Dâù Một, South Viêt Nam)) is the first woman to graduate from the Department of Geological Engineering of Laval University (Quebec, Canada), the first female Vietnamese geological engineer and archeologist. She is also a boat person.

Biography

1950–1979 
Her father was from Hai Duong (North Viet Nam), her mother from Nghê An (Centre Viet Nam), Hoàng T. T grew up in Saigon (Hô Chi Minh City). She studied at the elementary school of Da Kao and at the high school of Gia Long (currently Nguyễn thị Minh Khai), which are the all-women’s schools. In 1964, after getting high school diplomas I and II, she attended the first year of the politic-business college (Chính trị Kinh doanh), newly founded at University of Đà Lạt (300 km northeast Saigon).

In 1965, she got a scholarship granted by the Canadian government for Laval University (Quebec). Among different proposed matters (chemistry, electricity, geology, mechanic), she chose geology. However, there was only geological engineering at Laval University. She was the only woman in her class with 12 other young men. On the top of this, were added very busy schedule and difficulty relative to two foreign languages (French and English). Furthermore, the Canadian mining law at this time kept women out of the mine, so she could not make training course. After four years of study, she was the first graduated woman of the Department of Geological Engineering of Laval University.

In June 1969, Hoàng T. T. returned to Viet Nam and three months later she started to work at the Geological Survey of Saigon, which depended on the Ministry of Economy of that time. In this survey, there were two French expert geologists. One took her on the field to explain the geology of the country. The other passed on his experience about the mineral study by X-rays to her. The first expert, Henri Fontaine, became, from 1971 to 1973, director of her thesis of engineering doctor, which was carried on the study of the clays of southern Viet Nam and their industrial uses and on the history of the geological surveys of Indochina (1898-1953) and of Republic of Viet Nam (1953-1973).  Many small deposits, almost kaolin, were during longtime exploited for making porcelain or ceramic products, as well as bricks and roofing tiles. On the view of mineralogy, these clays were unknown. With the help of a diffractometer, Hoàng T. T. analyzed about a hundred samples of clays from diverse origins: kaolin from alluvions of ancient Quaternary (Province of Bình Dương, Biên Hoà) ), the clays of recent alluvions (different localities between Mekong and Đông Nai river), or from the weathering of granite, rhyolite and shale of Đà Lạt area (Province of Lâm Đồng). At the same time, she mentioned for the first time in Viet Nam the existence of bentonite being under a cover of red basaltic earth at Di Linh (Province of Lâm Đồng). Of volcano-lakeside origin, this clay was reported but not analyzed by Edmond Saurin In 1974, she discovered the same bentonite at Bảo Lộc area (Province of Lâm Đồng)(mixed with fragments of brown coal) and early 1975 at Tuy Hoà area (Province of Khánh Hòa). The study of these samples was not published because of politic events.

Hoàng T. T. often accompanied Dr H. Fontaine in his archeological researches. In 1971, they discovered and excavated a funeral jars site at Phú Hoà (Province of Đồng Nai). Dated roughly 500 years B.C., this site belongs to Sa Huynh culture. The study of this site permitted her to become the first Vietnamese woman archeologist. In 1974, General Agency of Oil-Gas and Mineral Resources (Tổng cục Dâù Khí và Khoáng Sản) was founded and divided in different departments, of which the Centre of Geological Research (former  Geological Survey) which included three surveys: research, chemical laboratory, library & geological museum. She was required to accept to be chief of the latter (library & geological museum), to keep her X-ray lab and her research work. Between 1972 and 1974, she gave some lectures at two Universities of Huế (about 700 km northeast Saigon) and of Cần Thơ (about 150 km southwest Saigon).

On 1 May 1975, the communists took power over South Viet Nam. Hoàng T.T. participated in a group of street sweepers and market cleaners near her home. All former state employees and the former military had to follow a political re-education. The duration of these courses varied from three or ten days in their survey, to one month in a camp. The latter was reserved for former chiefs of survey, directors…and military officers. Being former chief of survey, she had to go to a camp in theory for one month (in reality it was indefinite). The day before her departure, without explanation, she was authorized to stay and to follow three days of politic re-education. During four years, except some short trips on the field with new colleagues (geologists and archaeologists) from the North, she could make nothing else.

1979–2009 
In early May 1979, to seize a place on a boat the departure of which was imminent, with the agreement of her mother, she left her family with a tiny bag. Four or five days later, her boat arrived in southern Malaysia (Kota Tinggi). She accepted to be interpreter and was elected leader of her boat as well as the whole camp reaching about a thousand boat people. A month and half later, all boat people were moved to another camp at Mersing where three thousands or so refugees overcrowded into an ancient football field. One day, half of them were sent back to the sea, the other half lived in fear. July 1979, a French delegation (the only foreign delegation because the camp was unknown by the United Nations High Commissioner for Refugees (UNHCR) came there to choose who had a residence certificate in France and isolated children (their parents stayed in Viet Nam). As all other boat leaders, she had to present to them who they looked for. Whereas she did not demand anything for her, these French men told they could not take her into France because she had no residence certificate. Two days later, the French men came back to propose taking her in France. With surprise, she accepted this offer though she hoped inside her to return to Canada or to rejoin her brothers in the United States.

31 August 1979, she landed on Paris with flip flops, her bag and a 20 US dollar banknote offered by a Malay officer. October of the same year, getting a scholarship of University of Paris (Sorbonne) for preparing a thesis, she joined the Albert de Lapparent Geological Institute (Institut catholique de Paris) and tried to make its X ray lab working again.

Accepting the first job offer, on 10 March 1980 she took up her new career in Cogéma (becoming Areva in September 2001). France and Canada did not mutually recognize each other’s diploma (until Dominique de Villepin (French prime minister 2005–2007) signed an agreement with the Canadian government), this was not followed by large French companies, so Hoàng T. T. was engaged as engineer taking function of documentary geologist to prepare a weekly review of specialized press in the Survey of Diversification; she later became analyst of metal market for the Survey of Economic Study, and finally chargée de mission of the Direction of Financial Strategy and Economic Study. She produced many study reports on different subjects.

Since 2009 
From the beginning of her retirement, she devoted her time to the research in cooperation with her former director of thesis, Dr Henri Fontaine and some French and Thaï geologists. Of this cooperation, eight scientific papers were published on the geology of Thailand.

Bibliography 
 1971 – Fontaine H. et Hoang T. T. - Alluvions anciennes du Nam Phân septentrional. Arch. Géol. Viet Nam, 14 : 145-168, 4 pl., Saigon.
 1972 - Note sur des argiles du Viet Nam méridional. Arch. Géol. Viet Nam, 15 : 25-65, 3 pl., Saigon.
 1972 – Fontaine H., Bui K.H., Hoang T.T., et al. – Eau minérale dans les environs de Phuoc Lê. Remarque sur la géologie de cette région. Arch. Géol. Viet Nam, 15 : 145-148, Saigon.
 1972 – Fontaine H. et Hoang T.T. – Carte géologique au 1/25 000 : feuilles de Biên Hoa et Phu Cuong. Institut Géographique, Da Lat (Viet Nam).
 1973 – Deuxième note sur des argiles du Viet Nam méridional. Arch. Géol. Viet Nam, 17 : 57-66, Saigon.
 1973 – Le Service Géologique de l’Indochine (1898-1953)_Le Service Géologique de la République du Viet Nam (1953-1973). Bull. Soc. Et. Indoch., nouv. série, 48(4) : 609-614, Saigon.
 1975 – Fontaine H. et Hoang T.T. – Nouvelle note sur le champ de jarres funéraires de Phu Hoa, avec une remarque sur la crémation au Viet Nam. Bull. Soc. Et. Indoch., nouv. série, 50(1) : 7-73, 6 pl., Saigon.
 2003 – La première diplômée du Département de génie géologique de l’Université Laval (1965-1969). Géoscope. Journ. Info. Départ. Géol. & Génie géol. Uni. Laval, 4(3) : 5-6, Québec.
 2007 – Fontaine H., Hoang T.T. et al. – Permian limestones of Surat Thani Province, Peninsular Thailand. Geothai 07, International conference on geology of Thailand: 221-228, 4pl.
 2009 – Fontaine H., Hoang T.T. et al. – Paleontology and stratigraphy of the Pang Mapha-Ban Na Wai region, Northwest Thailand: paleogeographical implications. Publication of the Department of Mineral Resources, August 2009: 1-161, 39 pl..
 2009 – Fontaine H., Hoang T.T. et al. – Limestone exposures south of Phetchabun, mainly in the 1:50 000 Ban Na Chaliang sheet, Central Thailand. Publication of the Department of Mineral Resources, August 2009: 163-167, 12 pl..
 2011 – Fontaine H., Chonglakmani C., Hoang T.T. et al. – Devonian limestone in northern Laos along Mekong River. World Conference on Paleontology and Stratigraphy, Nakhon Ratchasima. Program and Abstracts, 61.
 2012 – Fontaine H., Hoang T.T. et al. – North Thailand 1-Very fossiliferous limestone belonging to the end of the Permian (Upper-Chianghsingian) in Wiang Sa area. 2-Another Upper Permian limestone in Phrea area. Journal of Science and Technology, Mahasarakham University, 3(1): 51-62, 6 pl..
 2012 – Fontaine H., Kavinate S., Hoang T.T. and Vachard D. – Permian limestone of Peninsula and western Thailand in Khao Yoi, Cha-Am and Thong Pha Phum areas. Nat. Hist. Bull. Siam Soc., 58: 39-47, 3 pl..
 2013 – Fontaine H., Hoang T.T. et al. – Upper Permian (Late Chianghsingian) marine strata in Nan Province, northern Thailand. Journ. Asian Earth Sc., 76: 115-119.
 2013 – Fontaine H., Hoang T.T. et al. – Wide extension of Carboniferous limestone in Northwest Thailand with an interesting stratigraphy. Special Issue of the Journal of the Geological Society of Thailand, 65 p., 24 pl.

References

External links 
 Université Laval
 Bibliothèque_Missions Etrangères de Paris
 Natural history Bulletin of the Siam Society

1944 births
Vietnamese women geologists
Living people
Vietnamese women archaeologists
Vietnamese archaeologists
Université Laval alumni
21st-century Vietnamese women